Napraty  is a village in the administrative district of Gmina Kiwity, within Lidzbark County, Warmian-Masurian Voivodeship, in northern Poland.

The village has an approximate population of 100.

Notable residents
Otto Friedrich von der Groeben (1657-1728), Prussian general

References

Napraty